HMS Antelope was a 14-gun brig of the Royal Navy. She was originally a mercantile brig, purchased in April 1784 at Jamaica by Vice-Admiral Gambier and commissioned that year under Lieutenant Robert Causzor. She sank in a hurricane on 30 July 1784 whilst at Jamaica.

Admiral Gambier had acquired two brigs but the Admiralty countermanded their purchase and ordered Gambier to sell them. The hurricane on 30 July sank Antelope on the western wharf. The same hurricane drove Duke of Rutland ashore, breaking her back.

Citations and references
Citations

References
 
 

Brigs of the Royal Navy
1780s ships
Maritime incidents in 1784